Jamie Murray and Jelena Janković were the defending champions but Janković did not participate. Murray partnered with Liezel Huber but lost in the semifinals to Bob Bryan and Samantha Stosur.

Bryan and Stosur defeated Mike Bryan and Katarina Srebotnik in the final, 7–5, 6–4 to win the mixed doubles tennis title at the 2008 Wimbledon Championships.

Seeds
All seeds received a bye into the second round. 

  Mike Bryan /  Katarina Srebotnik (final)
  Daniel Nestor /  Chuang Chia-jung (quarterfinals)
  Pavel Vízner /  Květa Peschke (quarterfinals)
  Paul Hanley /  Cara Black (third round)
  Kevin Ullyett /  Ai Sugiyama (quarterfinals)
  Julian Knowle /  Chan Yung-jan (third round)
  Mark Knowles /  Yan Zi (second round)
  Nenad Zimonjić /  Sun Tiantian (second round)
  Andy Ram /  Nathalie Dechy (quarterfinals)
  Leander Paes /  Rennae Stubbs (second round)
  Mahesh Bhupathi /  Sania Mirza (second round)
  Jamie Murray /  Liezel Huber (semifinals)
  Simon Aspelin /  Lisa Raymond (third round, withdrew)
  Martin Damm /  Peng Shuai (third round)
  Jeff Coetzee /  Vladimíra Uhlířová (second round)
  Jordan Kerr /  Kateryna Bondarenko (second round)

Draw

Finals

Top half

Section 1

Section 2

Bottom half

Section 3

Section 4

References

External links

2008 Wimbledon Championships on WTAtennis.com
2008 Wimbledon Championships – Doubles draws and results at the International Tennis Federation

X=Mixed Doubles
Wimbledon Championship by year – Mixed doubles